Caracaraí Ecological Station is an ecological station in the state of Roraima, Brazil.

Location
It is in the municipality of Caracaraí  in the state of Roraima.
It adjoins the Yanomami Indigenous Territory to the west.
The station is named after the municipality, whose name means "little hawk", a very common bird in the region.
It is administered by the Chico Mendes Institute for Biodiversity Conservation.

Conservation
The ecological station is a "strict nature reserve" under IUCN protected area category Ia.
The purpose is preservation of nature and support of scientific research.
There are several layers, with the higher trees losing their leaves in the dry season. 
The rubber tree Hevea brasiliensis is one of the upper layer trees.
Protected species include white-bellied spider monkey (Ateles belzebuth).

References

Sources

1982 establishments in Brazil
Ecological stations of Brazil
Protected areas of Roraima
Protected areas established in 1982